Knobby is an unincorporated community in Benton County, Missouri, United States.

A variant name of the community was Nobby. A post office called Knobby was established in 1885, the name was changed to Nobby in 1907, and the post office closed in 1913. The community takes its name from Knobby Creek.

References

Unincorporated communities in Benton County, Missouri
Unincorporated communities in Missouri